Jaane Tu... Ya Jaane Na ( Whether You Know Or Not) is a 2008 Indian Hindi-language coming of age romantic comedy film written and directed by Abbas Tyrewala and produced by Mansoor Khan and Aamir Khan under Aamir Khan Productions, with Ajay K. Bijli and Sanjeev K. Bijli of PVR Pictures acting as co-producers. Marking writer Tyrewala's full-fledged screenwriting and directorial debut, it also marks the debut of Aamir's nephew and lead actor Imran Khan with supporting actor Prateik Babbar, as well as the re-appearance of lead actress Genelia D'Souza and supporting actress Manjari Fadnis in Hindi cinema. The film's soundtrack, composed by A. R. Rahman, received high critical acclaim upon release and also was commercially successful.

Jaane Tu... Ya Jaane Na was released on 4 July 2008, and proved to be a major commercial success at the box office. It received widespread critical acclaim, with praise for its direction, story, screenplay, soundtrack, cinematography and performances of the cast. 

At the 54th Filmfare Awards, Jaane Tu... Ya Jaane Na received 12 nominations, including Best Film, Best Supporting Actress (Pathak Shah) and Best Supporting Actor (Babbar), and won 4 awards, including Best Male Debut (Imran Khan) and Best Music Director (Rahman),

Plot
The story begins as four friends travel with a guest to an airport, when Jignesh "Jiggy" Patel, Ravindran "Rotlu" Sahu, Sandhya "Bombs" Sahay and Shaleen Varma offer to tell Jiggy's date, air hostess Mala Mishra, the unique love story of Jai and Aditi, two friends who they have known.  Jai "Ratz" Singh Rathore is the most non-violent Rajput to have ever existed, while Aditi "Meow" Mahant is an aggressive and impulsive girl. Her nickname is the result of her abuse and scratching of people.

Despite their differences, Jai and Aditi are best friends in college. They seem perfectly meant for each other, a fact acknowledged by everyone except the two themselves. Aditi often has a bickering relationship with her brother Amit, who seems to hate Jai because of his polite and cool nature, and since Aditi cannot stand any insults against Jai, she regularly picks up fights with him. Aditi dreams of a virile, macho husband, while Jai wants a sweet, romantic girl. Since they do not believe that they are in love, they search for a perfect life partner for each other after finishing college. Jai falls in love with Meghna Pariyar after spotting her in a club where two rough men were misbehaving with her. He rescues her by tricking the duo, thus winning Meghna's heart. When Meghna and Jai get close to each other, Rotlu, Jiggy, Sandhya, and Shaleen are happy for Jai, but nobody notices that Aditi is missing Jai's company. Meghna informs Jai that her parents squabble but cannot live without each other. Jai visits Meghna's parents and sees that her father, Mahesh, is an alcoholic who has much friction with his ex-wife Sheela. Due to the meeting, he misses Aditi's surprise birthday party. Realizing that he missed the occasion, he goes late at night to wish her but is sent back after a conversation between the two culminates in Aditi asking him to leave.

Feeling deserted, Aditi gets engaged to her father's friend's son, Sushant Modi. She sees in him the macho man she always wanted. However, Sushant is also a spoilt playboy whose ex-girlfriend, Richa, has landed him in trouble twice. Amit, upon having a word with Sushant in person, tries to make her see Sushant for who he really is but Aditi continues her relationship, considering that Jai is still with Meghna. At Jiggy's birthday party, where Jai and Meghna are also present, Aditi introduces Sushant to everyone. Both Jai and Aditi are upset with each other's relationship. During a romantic dance, Sushant finds that Aditi is crying and kisses her, which upsets Jai further.

Meghna tries to cheer him up, but Jai becomes angrier, shouting at her and chiding her for being ignorant of the friction between her parents. She breaks down and tells him about her parents' divorce due to Mahesh's extramarital affair which affected her psychologically, leading her to imagine a perfect world and be childish so as to not be burdened with the reality of being a forced thread between her parents. The next day, Jai breaks up with Meghna whereby she is shattered to learn that he loves Aditi and leaves with a goodbye kiss. As for Aditi, she is under duress from Sushant, who, after realizing she loves Jai, slaps her on her face, leaving a bruise. She decides to break the engagement and go to New York to study alone, while actually wanting to return to Jai. When she meets Jai, he spots the bruise on Aditi's face, and contrary to his usual non-violent nature, goes to Sushant's house and beats him up for daring to lay a hand on Aditi.

Inspector P.K. Waghmare, who is at odds with Jai's mother Savitri Singh Rathore, arrests Jai for thrashing Sushant and puts him behind bars. Later that night, while still in prison, he meets the two men who were found harassing Meghna at the club and is surprised to see them celebrating their imprisonment. They tell him that for a boy to become a man in their clan, he must complete three conditions: 
1) thrash someone 
2) get arrested 
3) ride a horse. 
As they narrate to Jai the story of their adventures in Mumbai and mention that it wouldn't have been possible for them to fulfill these conditions in Ranjhor, he inadvertently reveals his credentials as a native of Ranjhor, which causes the two men, seemingly brothers to each other, to sit up and decipher his identity. Once he mentions that he is the son of the late Amar Singh Rathore and the two men confirm that his mother's name is Savitri, they clutch him to the ground in joy, and he discovers in an epiphany when they address him as "Mowgli" that the brothers are his long-lost cousins, Kuber "Baloo" Singh Rathore and Vinay "Bagheere" Singh Rathore, from whom he had been separated in childhood. Jai, who has already fulfilled the first two conditions required for becoming a man in the Rathore clan, finally comes to terms with his legacy, realizing that Amar was actually never the non-violent type Savitri had painted him as and that she was lying to him all along. 

Meanwhile, Aditi makes her way to the international airport to depart for New York. Baloo and Bagheere, who are sons of Amar's cousin, now an MLA, use their influence to bail Jai out, after which Jai rides to the airport on a borrowed horse to stop Aditi from leaving. This makes him fulfill the final condition, and an initially worried Savitri, after spotting him, decides to return home, dejected that Amar's dream has come true. Jai finds Aditi at the airport lounge and sings her the titular song which he had confessed earlier as the one he would sing for the love of his life. Aditi, delighted, hugs him and cancels her travel plans. Back in the present, Rotlu, Jiggy, Sandhya, and Shaleen conclude the story and welcome Jai and Aditi, who return from their honeymoon after 5 years, at the airport. Mala gets extremely delighted to see them and introduces herself as Jiggy's girlfriend, and they leave the airport together.

Cast

 Imran Khan as Jai "Ratz" Singh Rathore a.k.a. Mowgli
 Genelia D'Souza as Aditi "Meow" Mahant
 Nirav Mehta as Jignesh "Jiggy" Patel
 Alishka Varde as Sandhya "Bombs" Sahay
 Karan Makhija as Ravindran "Rotlu" Sahu
 Sugandha Garg as Shaleen Varma
 Ayaz Khan as Sushant Modi, Aditi's fiancé
 Prateik Babbar as Amit Mahant, Aditi's brother
 Manjari Fadnis as Meghna Pariyar, Jai's girlfriend (Few lines as Mona Ghosh Shetty)
 Murali Sharma as CISF Inspector Prakash Suman
 Padam Bhola as Vivek Kapoor aka Pappu
 Ratna Pathak as Savitri Singh Rathore, Jai's mother
 Naseeruddin Shah as Amar Singh Rathore, Jai's father
 Paresh Rawal as Inspector P. K. Waghmare
 Sohail Khan as Vinay "Bagheere" Singh Rathore, Jai's long-lost cousin from Ranjhor and Baloo's brother
 Arbaaz Khan as Kuber "Baloo" Singh Rathore, Jai's long-lost cousin from Ranjhor and Bagheere's brother 
 Renuka Kunzru as Mala Mishra, Jiggy's date
 Anuradha Patel as Vishakha "Pumpkin" Mahant, Aditi's mother
 Jayant Kripalani as Vishwas "Peachy" Mahant, Aditi's father
 Kitu Gidwani as Sheela Pariyar, Meghna's Mother
 Rajat Kapoor as Mahesh Pariyar, Meghna's Father
 Shakun Batra as Nilesh Pandit, Vivek's friend

Release 

The film was released on 4 July 2008. The premiere of the film was held at the PVR Cinemas in Goregaon, Mumbai where many Bollywood stars like Amitabh Bachchan, Anil Kapoor, Sonam Kapoor, Shekhar Kapur, Kabir Bedi, Raveena Tandon, Juhi Chawla, Jackie Shroff, Ashutosh Gowariker, Minissha Lamba, Shamita Shetty, Subhash Ghai, Sridevi, Boney Kapoor and Yash Chopra were present. The film was released with 473 prints worldwide, which includes 282 analogue prints, 81 digital screens and 110 prints overseas. In its second week, the number of shows at multiplexes were increased while 100 more centres were opened.

Reception

Critical response

Jaane Tu... Ya Jaane Na received widespread critical acclaim upon release. Rediff.com gave it a 4 out of 5, praising it for "a rock-solid ensemble cast that is mouthwateringly perfect". Movie Talkies has given it 4 stars, writing that "the coolest, warmest, hippest and funniest musical romantic comedy in years has arrived, and a new Khan is born." Glamsham gave it another 4 out of 5, noting it as "another fruitful outing for Aamir Khan. This man certainly knows what he is doing." Planet Bollywood gave it 4 stars, calling it "a fresh breezy entertainer which undoubtedly is the best the year has seen so far." AOL India reviewer Noyon Jyoti Parasara gave it 3.5 out of 5 and said, "Jaane Tu... Ya Jaane Na weaves in a lot of emotions right from friendship, love to insecurity. Every character is shown to have a definite backing, which means a very good job by the writer." Taran Adarsh of IndiaFM gave it 3.5 stars, calling it "a breezy entertainer which will be loved by its target audience – the youth".

Box office

Jaane Tu... Ya Jaane Na was an early success, with 80% or more in morning shows and 100% by the noon shows across India. Monday usually witnesses a drop in business for films in India, but Jaane Tu... Ya Jaane Na had strong showings on Monday (75%), Tuesday (70%) and Wednesday (60%+). For the second week, the number of shows were increased and it started the week grossing almost 100% at several screens.

Soundtrack 

The music of Jaane Tu... Ya Jaane Na, composed by A. R. Rahman with lyrics by Abbas Tyrewala, was released in India on 20 May 2008 with producer Aamir Khan presenting the first audio CD to veteran actor Shammi Kapoor. The soundtrack held the number one spot on the music charts for several consecutive weeks. The soundtrack received highly positive reviews from critics, with "Pappu Can't Dance" becoming one of the major hits of 2008. Rahman was awarded with the Filmfare Award for Best Music Director and the Star Screen Award for Best Music Director for the soundtrack. The track "Kabhi Kabhi Aditi" was nominated for Best Lyricist (Tyrewala) and Best Male Playback Singer (Rashid Ali) at the Filmfare Awards. According to the Indian trade website Box Office India, with around 15,00,000 units sold, this film's soundtrack album was the year's eighth highest-selling.

Accolades

 54th Filmfare Awards:

Won

 Best Male Debut – Imran Khan
 Best Music Director – A. R. Rahman
 Best Choreography – Longines Fernandes for "Pappu Can't Dance Saala!"
 Special Jury Mention – Prateik Babbar

Nominated

 Best Film
 Best Supporting Actress – Ratna Pathak Shah
 Best Supporting Actor – Prateik Babbar
 Best Male Debut – Prateik Babbar
 Best Lyricist – Abbas Tyrewala for "Kabhi Kabhi Aditi"
 Best Male Playback Singer – Rashid Ali for "Kabhi Kabhi Aditi"
 Best Screenplay – Abbas Tyrewala
 Best Dialogue – Abbas Tyrewala

2009 Star Screen Awards:
 Won – Best Music Director – A. R. Rahman
Nominated – Most Promising Newcomer (Male) – Imran Khan
4th Apsara Film & Television Producers Guild Awards:
 Best Male Debut – Imran Khan
2009 Star Sabsey Favourite Kaun Awards:
 Naya Hero – Imran Khan
2009 Stardust Awards:
 Breakthrough Performance Award (Male) – Prateik Babbar
 Breakthrough Performance Award (Female) – Manjari Phadnis
 New Musical Sensation (Male) – Benny Dayal for "Pappu Can't Dance Saala!"

References

External links

2008 films
2000s Hindi-language films
2000s coming-of-age comedy-drama films
2008 romantic comedy-drama films
2000s buddy films
Indian buddy films
Indian coming-of-age comedy-drama films
Indian romantic comedy-drama films
Films scored by A. R. Rahman
2008 comedy films
2008 drama films